Anthony Günther may refer to:

 Anthony Günther, Count of Oldenburg (1583–1667), Imperial Count and member of the House of Oldenburg
 Anthony Günther, Prince of Anhalt-Zerbst (1653–1714), German prince of the House of Ascania